The Mary Jane Colter Buildings are four structures at Grand Canyon National Park designed by Mary Colter.  Built between 1905 and 1932, the four buildings (Hermits Rest (1914), Desert View Watchtower (1932), Lookout Studio (1914), and Hopi House (1905)) are among the best examples of Colter's work, and were influential in the development of an aesthetic for architecture to be used in America's National Park System.  As a set, they were declared a National Historic Landmark in 1987.

Description and significance

Hopi House and the Lookout Studio are located in the Grand Canyon Village, a National Historic Landmark district comprising the core of the densest development in the park. Hermit's Rest is located at the end of the paved road a few miles to the west of Grand Canyon Village. All four buildings were originally built by the Atchison, Topeka & Santa Fe Railroad, and were managed by the railroad's concessionaire, the Fred Harvey Company.

Mary Colter's designs were influenced in part by the many ancient ruins of the American Southwest, as exemplified in Hopi House and the Desert View Watchtower, both of which resulted from her study of existing structures and ruins.  Hopi House is a modern take on a dwelling of the Hopi people, while the tower borrows architecturally from a variety of ruins.  The tower's interior also includes reproductions of rock art from a site that has since been destroyed.  The Hermit's Rest and Lookout Studio, in contrast, were designed to fit organically into their surrounding landscape, a technique which would be adopted by other architects working on projects for the National Park Service.

See also

 List of National Historic Landmarks in Arizona

References

External links
 National Park Service.gov:  Architecture in the Parks, A National Historic Landmark Theme Study: M.E.J. Colter Buildings; by Laura Soullière Harrison, 1986.
 Official Grand Canyon National Park website

 
Buildings and structures in Grand Canyon National Park
Grand Canyon history
Park buildings and structures on the National Register of Historic Places in Arizona
National Register of Historic Places in Coconino County, Arizona
National Historic Landmarks in Arizona
National Historic Landmark Districts
Pueblo Revival architecture in Arizona
American Craftsman architecture in Arizona
Arts and Crafts architecture in Arizona
Rustic architecture in Arizona
Rustic style architects
Spanish Colonial Revival architects
Historic districts on the National Register of Historic Places in Arizona
National Register of Historic Places in Grand Canyon National Park